Moglaa is a community in the  Savelugu-Nanton District in the Norte hern Region of Ghana. It is one of the 143 rural communities located in the district with nucleated settlement. Predominantly, the households are male-headed with their main occupation being farming.

References 

Communities in Ghana